A list of happenings in 2012 in Kenya:

Incumbents
President: Mwai Kibaki
Vice-President: Kalonzo Musyoka
Chief Justice: Willy Mutunga

Events

June
June 10 – 6 people died in the police helicopter crash.
June 26 - The United States embassy in Nairobi held what was believed to be the first ever LGBT pride event in Kenya. A public affairs officer at the embassy said, "The U.S. government for its part has made it clear that the advancement of human rights for LGBT people is central to our human rights policies around the world and to the realization of our foreign policy goals". Similar events were held at other U.S. embassies around the world.

July
July 25 – Moyale clashes occurred.

August
August 22 – 52 people died during the Tana River District clashes.

Deaths

June
 June 10 - George Saitoti and Orwa Ojode are killed in a Helicopter Crash

Sports
 August 9 - At the 2012 Summer Olympics in London, Kenya's David Rudisha led from start to finish to win gold becoming the first and, so far, only runner to have broken the 1:41 barrier for 800m

See also
2012 in Kenyan football

References

Further reading
 

 
Years of the 21st century in Kenya